The Jewish Federation (JFED), is generally a secular Jewish non-profit organization, found within many metropolitan areas across the United States with a significant Jewish community.  They provide supportive and human services, philanthropy, financial grants to refugees around the world, humanitarian and disaster relief, host leadership conferences and fellowship opporunites for women and youth, charitable drives, help those in need navigate comprehensive resources, and provide outreach to at-risk Jewish populations in 70 countries worldwide, and more. While the Jewish Federation was created to primarily to service Jewish communities, they also provide for other communities. All federations in North America operate an annual central campaign, then allocate the proceeds to affiliated local agencies. There are currently 146 Jewish Federations, the national umbrella organization for the federations is the Jewish Federations of North America, in the United States.

Background
Starting in 1654, when the first Jewish communal settlement in New Amsterdam (modern-day New York) began despite Governor Peter Stuyvesant's attempts to ban the first Jewish people in North America from the settlement (until he was evenutally overruled), and for the next 250 years; the Jewish community promised local governments they wouldn't become a burden, by taking care of their own community. Through-out this period, as the Jewish community continued to grow in what would become the United States, they "established synagogues, burial societies, credit unions, and Hebrew youth societies in dozens of cities before there was a single federation."

According to Historian, Donald Feldstein in The Jewish Federation: The First Hundred Years:
″There is no single source where one can find a comprehensive history of the Jewish Federation in North America...The first Jewish Federation in the United States was founded in Boston in 1895, another was organized in Cincinnati, Ohio, and within several years federations sprung up around the country wherever there were significant Jewish communities."

The founding philosophies of the first Jewish Federations in America were based in secularism, but deeply influenced by Jewish tradition, like Hesed (loving kindness); and organized like the Kehilla, a communal organization found in diverse regions throughout Eastern Europe at the time; created to meet the welfare needs of Jewish communities in an inclusive and comprehensive way. However, unlike the Kehilla, which were usually formed under the authority of local governments to collect taxes from the Jewish community in support of services, the Jewish Federation in the United States has always been fully autonomous.61-62

History
The first Jewish federation was founded in Boston in 1895 as Associated Jewish Philanthropies. Cincinnati formed its federation, United Jewish Social Agencies, the next year. Chicago founded its federation in 1900 followed by St. Louis. Federations were soon formed in many other cities with large Jewish populations. Initially (1895-1945) the federation system was focused on welfare needs of individual Jews with the goal of integrating them into the US.  The Jewish federations inspired the 1913 formation of the forerunner of the United Way, the community chest in Cleveland, Ohio.

In 1932, an umbrella organization for the federations was formed called the National Council of Jewish Federations and Welfare Funds.

The United Jewish Appeal (UJA) national campaign and organization was started in 1939. With the foundation of the Israel state in 1948, the UJA increased in importance.

Until the 1960s with the start of Medicaid and Medicare, federations allocated large portions of the campaign funds to Jewish hospitals.

Structure
Each federation is autonomous from federations of other cities and they tend to focus on local concerns. The federations typically have elected boards or trustees that are accountable to the community, paid staff, and volunteer leadership. Originally, the federations operated on volunteer only basis, but quickly turned to professional staffs. They engage in centralized planning for the needs of the local community, and may provide centralized administrative services for their constituent agencies.

Depending on the size of the community, the federation may provide services directly or fund another agency to provide that function. For example, the federation may have a local as an arm or function, if not provided by a separate federation funded agency.

Community Relations Council
Most local federations are either affiliated with or host a local Jewish Community Relations Council, which deals with local antisemitism, Holocaust education support, and inter-religious or interracial community functions and organizations.70-71 Depending on local preferences, the JCRC may be volunteer or professionally-staffed, and may have varying degrees of structural separateness from the federation itself.

Fundraising and spending
Federations raise money for central, local campaigns that support the organizations of the entire local Jewish community.  Historically, with a number of Jewish institutions running their own fundraising campaigns, Jewish communities leadership felt it could be more efficient to instead have a single campaign that could centralize gift-making.

Between 30 and 50 percent of Jewish households in the United States typically contribute to their local federation. Jfeds also raise money for the national United Jewish Appeal campaign that sends funding overseas and may combine the Federation annual and United Jewish Appeal into one campaign. The federations or the federation system may hold special campaigns in addition to the annual campaign.

Federation spending and efforts have adapted as the need for particular social services has changed—for example, from Jewish orphanage work in the early twentieth century to retirement homes in the late twentieth century.

A significant feature of the annual federation campaign is "Super Sunday", a day designated for community-wide phone banking, seeking contributions from members of the community.

More than half of all funds raised by federations are earmarked for various local Jewish social service agencies, with the largest single allocation to Jewish education, typically constituting 25 percent.  After education, Jewish community centers, the local Jewish family and child services, homes for the aged, and campus Hillels are the next largest recipients of financial support. In some communities were the federation does not provide the service, a Jewish vocational service agency is usually funded to provide job related services.

As an example, in 2008, the Overnight Camp Incentive Program provided grant money to 18 campers to attend Pinemere Camp. The program is a joint project of the Jewish Federation of Greater Philadelphia, the Foundation for Jewish Camp, and the Neubauer Family Foundation. The program provided grants of $750 to $1,250. The majority of the Pinemere campers who received grants chose to return the following summer.

Role in community
Jewish federations can wield a sizable degree of influence in the Jewish communities in which they are located.  Many of the local federations hold annual fundraising drives that are expected to raise most of the next year's budgeting for many community programs. In return, in many communities the agencies which receive funding from the federation agree not to engage in major fundraising for themselves for a number of months often called the "primacy period" when the local federation's fundraising has primacy. Decisions made by the local federations can have a great impact on the community, including the opening or closing of programs, staff hirings and firings, and land purchases and sales.

Jewish family and child services
Jewish Family and Child Services (JFCS) is usually the general social service agency supported by the local federation. A JFCS may have other names like Jewish Family Services, Jewish Family & Children's Service, Jewish Family & Community Services, Jewish Community Services, or other derivatives. Similar to the federation, a JFCS may be a part of the federation, the only Jewish service agency in a community, or may be several separate agencies.

References

Further reading
 Berkman,  Matthew.  “Transforming Philanthropy: Finance and Institutional Evolution at the Jewish Federation of New York, 1917–86,” Jewish Social Studies 22#2 (2017): 146–195.
 Berman, Lila Corwin. "How Americans Give: The Financialization of American Jewish Philanthropy" American Historical Review 122#5 (2017): 1459-1489. 
 Elazar, Daniel J. Community and Polity: The Organizational Dynamics of American Jewry (1995) see pp 211–18 for a listing of the community Jewish federations and the founding date.
 Feldstein, Donald "The Jewish Federation: The First Hundred Years". in Norman Linzer, David J. Schnall, & Jerome A. Chanes, eds. A portrait of the American Jewish community (1998). 
 Liebman, Charles S.  “Leadership and Decision-Making in a Jewish Federation: The New York Federation of Jewish Philanthropies,” in American Jewish Year Book (1979): 3–76.
 More,  Deborah Dash.  “From Kehillah to Federation: The Communal Functions of Federated Philanthropy in New York City, 1917–1933,” American Jewish History 68#2 (1978): 131–146.
 Nissim, Hanna Shaul Bar. "The Adaptation Process of Jewish Philanthropies to Changing Environments: The Case of the UJA-Federation of New York Since 1990." Contemporary Jewry 38.1 (2018): 79-105.
 Wenger, Beth S. “Federation Men: The Masculine World of New York Jewish Philanthropy, 1880–1945,” American Jewish History 101#3 (2017): 377–399.

External links
Jewish Federations of North America Official website

Federation
Jewish Federations of North America